Patrick Anderson (1719–1793) was an American Patriot who was an officer in the French and Indian War and the American Revolution and later was a member of the Pennsylvania General Assembly .

Patrick Anderson was the son of James Anderson, an early Scot (c. 1707) immigrant to Pennsylvania and Elizabeth Jerman (Jarman), the daughter of Thomas Jerman, a Welsh Quaker, who purchased one of William Penn’s first grist milling licenses (History of Tredyffrin Twp, PA ).

Patrick was born at “Anderson Place,” in then Charlestown Township, Pennsylvania now Schuylkill Township, Chester County, Pennsylvania, near Valley Forge, Pennsylvania.  He was the first person of European descent born in Charlestown Township.

He was educated in Philadelphia and returned home to farm.  He built, opened and taught at the first school house in the Valley Forge area.  He was married 3 times, the first time to Hannah Martin in historic Christ Church, Philadelphia .

Patrick was captain of a company of Chester County men who served in the French and Indian War.

At the time of the Revolution, Patrick was serving on Anthony Wayne's first Chester County Committee of Safety.  The Assembly sent a Captain's Commission to him, and, although an older man, being 55 at the time, Patrick accepted it, called together his old soldiers, and the entire company of fifty-six men enlisted. His company was known as the Chester County Minute Men of 1775.  Patrick paid for and outfitted his entire company but was never compensated by the Continental Congress, and lost half of his farm, which he had mortgaged to a neighbor.

In March 1776, he was appointed senior captain of the Pennsylvania Battalion of Musketry (sometimes called Samuel Atlee's Battalion)(Pennsylvania Archives»Series 5»Volume II»The Musketry Battalion. Colonel Samuel J. Atlee. March 6, 1776.(a)»Page 467 ) and fought for one tour of the Revolution, until the impairment of his health compelled his retirement.  He was a member of the Society of the Cincinnati.

He fought bravely at the Battle of Long Island, Battle of Fort Washington, the Battle of Brandywine and Battle of Germantown.  A letter from Patrick to Benjamin Franklin  describing the disarray of the Pennsylvania troops after the Battle of Long Island is preserved in the Pennsylvania State Archives (Penna. Archives, 1st series, vol. v. p. 26 - quoted here).

Major Patrick Anderson served in the Pennsylvania Assembly from 1778 to 1781. In 1781 he was appointed one of the commissioners for the Committee of Navigation of the Schuylkill River.

Patrick died in 1793.  His service to his country has been commemorated through a pew dedicated in his honor at the Washington Memorial Chapel at Valley Forge National Park, the engraved inscription reads:

Patrick is believed to be buried in the churchyard at St. Peter's of the Great Valley where he was a Vestryman however, his actual grave site has been lost to changes made to the church over the years.  A large bronze plaque commemorates his memory inside the old church, almost directly over his presumed burial site.

His son Isaac Anderson (congressman) also served in the Revolution and later as a US Congressman representing the area.  Patrick is the Great Grandfather of 2 prominent Pennsylvania political figures, Hon. Matthew S. Quay through the marriage of his daughter, Ascenath Anderson, to Joseph Quay and Gov. Samuel W. Pennypacker through the marriage of his granddaughter, Sarah Anderson, to Matthias Pennypacker.

References

A Brief History of Schuylkill Township
The Political Graveyard
Beaver County, PA History: Matthew Quay

Citations
 Smith, G, History of Delaware County, Pennsylvania, Ashmead, 1862
 Futhey, J. Smith & Cope, Gilbert, History of Chester County, Pennsylvania, Louis H. Everts, 1881
 Heathcote, Charles William, History of Chester County Pennsylvania, Horace Temple, 1928
 Pennypacker Gov. Samuel W., Annals of Phoenixville and its Vicinity, Bavis & Pennypacker, 1872
 Pennypacker Gov. Samuel W., Pennsylvania in American History, William J. Campbell, 1910
 Sutton, Isaac C., Notes of Family History: The Anderson, Schofield, Pennypacker, and Other Allied Families, Stephenson Bros., 1948

1719 births
1793 deaths
People of colonial Pennsylvania
Pennsylvania militiamen in the American Revolution
People of Pennsylvania in the French and Indian War
Continental Army officers from Pennsylvania
American people of Welsh descent
Burials in Pennsylvania
People from Chester County, Pennsylvania